Erdan may refer to:
 Gilad Erdan, Israeli politician
 Erdan Island, Lieyu Township, Kinmen County, Taiwan
 Erdan, Iran, a village in Yazd Province, Iran

See also
 Ardan (disambiguation)